Julie Trustrup Jensen  (born 6 April 1994) is a Danish women's international footballer who plays as a midfielder for the Danish women's national team as well as for Vålerenga in the Norwegian Toppserien.

Club career
Trustrup Jensen played for B73 Slagelse until 2009, when she joined Brøndby IF. Good form in season 2010–11 led to Trustrup Jensen being named Denmark's Young Player of the Year. She scored a goal in the 3–2 Danish Women's Cup final win over rivals Fortuna Hjørring. She quit football in 2014 to travel round the world, but soon came back to her career with Brøndby. In June 2015 she scored an injury time winning goal in the Cup final against Fortuna, as Brøndby won 2–1.

International career
Trustrup Jensen's made her debut for the Denmark women's national football team in September 2013. She was a substitute for Brøndby team-mate Nanna Christiansen in the 53rd minute of a 4–0 friendly win over Hungary in Budapest. She was a part of the team for the 2016 Algarve Cup.

References

External links

 
 Profile at Danish Football Association 

1994 births
Living people
Danish women's footballers
Place of birth missing (living people)
Women's association football midfielders
Denmark women's international footballers
Brøndby IF (women) players
Vålerenga Fotball Damer players